Joshua Rogers (born March 22, 1994) is an American gospel singer who rose to prominence in 2012 when he became the first male and youngest winner of Black Entertainment Television's Sunday Best during the show's fifth season.

Early life and education

A native of Greeleyville, South Carolina, Rogers grew up singing and playing the drums in the Apostolic church pastored by his grandmother. He graduated from C.E. Murray High School in 2012.

Sunday Best
Rogers auditioned for the fifth season of Sunday Best in Atlanta, and was immediately a favorite of fans and the celebrity judging panel of Yolanda Adams, Donnie McClurkin, and CeCe Winans. Sunday Best host Kirk Franklin gave Rogers the nickname "Young Buck". After weeks of consistent performances of songs such as Vanessa Bell Armstrong's "Peace Be Still", Deitrick Haddon's "Well Done", and Andrae Crouch's "We Expect You", Rogers landed in the finals of Sunday Best alongside another teen singer, Alexis Spight, with Rogers ultimately going on to win. He became the show's first male and youngest champion. With his win, Rogers received a cash prize, a 2013 Ford Escape, and a recording contract with Music World Entertainment.

After Sunday Best
Rogers released his first album, Well Done, on December 4, 2012. The album featured songs performed by Rogers on Sunday Best. Well Done debuted at #1 on the Billboard Gospel Album Charts with 5,917 sales in its first week.

Rogers released his second album, Unconditional, on October 29, 2013. This is his first album of original music and he co-wrote some of the songs. It debuted at #2 on the Billboard Gospel Album charts.

Discography
Well Done (2012)
Unconditional (2013)
Returning (2018)

References

External links
Official website
Music World Entertainment profile
Facebook fan page

21st-century African-American male singers
Living people
American gospel singers
American performers of Christian music
American child singers
Singers from South Carolina
1994 births
People from Williamsburg County, South Carolina
21st-century American singers
21st-century American male singers